Pretty Summer Playlist: Season 1 is the third extended play (EP) by American rapper Saweetie and was released on April 16, 2021. The project contains guest appearances by Bbyafricka, Kendra Jae, Lourdiz, Loui, and Drakeo the Ruler. The EP was supported by the promotional singles "Risky" featuring Drakeo the Ruler and "Talkin' Bout" by Loui featuring Saweetie. The EP precedes the release of Saweetie's upcoming debut studio album, Pretty Bitch Music.

Track listing

References

2021 EPs
EPs by American artists
Hip hop EPs